Tlepolemus is a Greek mythological figure, a son of Heracles who fought on the Greek side in the Trojan War.

Tlepolemus may also refer to:
 Tlepolemus (beetle), a genus of beetles
 Tlepolemus (general), one of the generals of Alexander the Great in 336-323 BC
 Tlepolemus (regent of Egypt), regent in Ptolemaic Egypt around 200 BC